Vistabella may refer to:
Vistabella, Zaragoza or Vistabella de Huerva in Aragon, Spain
Vistabella del Maestrat in the Valencian Community
Vistabella River in San Fernando, Trinidad and Tobago
Vistabella, Tarragona in Catalonia
Vistabella, Santa Cruz de Tenerife in the Canary Islands
Mahuella, Tauladella, Rafalell y Vistabella in Valencia City
Vistabella, Níjar in Andalusia
 Vistabella, a quarter in the city of Murcia